Peshnigort is a rural locality (a selo) in Stepanovskoye Rural Settlement, Kudymkarsky District, Perm Krai, Russia. The population was 856 as of 2010. There are 25 streets.

Geography 
Peshnigort is located 9 km southwest of Kudymkar (the district's administrative centre) by road. Zarechny Peshnigort is the nearest rural locality.

References 

Rural localities in Kudymkarsky District